is a Japanese football player. He plays for Vonds Ichihara.

Club statistics

References

External links

1985 births
Living people
Shizuoka Sangyo University alumni
Association football people from Chiba Prefecture
Japanese footballers
J2 League players
Thespakusatsu Gunma players
Vonds Ichihara players
Association football midfielders